Jacqui Russell (born 1 August 1988) is an Australian netball player in the Suncorp Super Netball league, playing for the Sunshine Coast Lightning.

Russell began her netball career at the Queensland Firebirds in the ANZ Championship, where she played for the club in 2010 and 2011 and was part of the club's premiership winning team in the latter year. She returned to top-level netball in 2018, replacing Sarahpheinna Woulf as a permanent injury replacement player at the Sunshine Coast Lightning at the start of the season. In between that time Russell was a captain of the Queensland Fusion team in the second-tier Australian Netball League. She was part of the Lightning's premiership success in the 2018 season and afterwards was re-signed by the club for the following season.

References

External links
 Sunshine Coast Lightning profile
 Suncorp Super Netball profile
 Netball Draft Central profile

1988 births
Australian netball players
Queensland Firebirds players
Sunshine Coast Lightning players
Living people
Suncorp Super Netball players
Yorkshire Jets players
Netball Superleague players
Australian expatriate sportspeople in England
Territory Storm players
Australian Netball League players
Netball players from Queensland
Australian Institute of Sport netball players
Queensland Fusion players
Queensland state netball league players